Kaboye Alludu ( Would be Son-in-law) is a 1987 Telugu-language comedy film, produced by M. Chandra Kumar under the P.V.S. Films banner and directed by Relangi Narasimha Rao. It stars Rajendra Prasad, Chandra Mohan, Shantipriya, Kalpana  and music composed by Chakravarthy. It was released on 27 March 1987.

Plot
The film begins on an avaricious couple Govinda Rao (Gollapudi Maruthi Rao) & Meenakshi (Y. Vijaya). They aspire to possess the vast sum of dowry for the son Prasad (Rajendra Prasad) and knit a rich alliance to daughter Rekha (Shantipriya) without a dowry. However, Prasad is against dowry who falls for a beautiful girl Saroja (Kalpana) with the same intentions. So, Govinda Rao silently acquires 10 lakhs of dowry from Saroja's father (Suthi Veerabhadra Rao). Before long, truth outs when Prasad & Saroja feud to recover the dowry amount. Meanwhile, Govinda Rao finds a guy Rajesh for Rekha, son of a jet-set Peddapuram Siddhaiah (Kota Srinivasa Rao). Right now, Govinda Rao finalizes the match, during, Siddhaiah is about to leave for a foreign trip, so, he informs his son through a letter to halt at Govinda Rao's residence until his return. Besides, the story shifts on two petty thieves, Rambabu (Chandra Mohan) & his friend (Suthi Velu)  fortuitously, the letter is uncovered by them. At present, the tricksters land therein and utilize the fortune, yet, Rambabu truly loves Rekha. After 3 months, Siddhaiah backs necks them out when Rekha is pregnant, cognizing it, Siddhaiah calls off the match. Thereupon, the elders decide to couple up Rekha with Rambabu when he seeks 2 lakhs of dowry and Govinda Rao is unable to raise the fund. Eventually, Rambabu follows with another nuptial when Govinda Rao realizes his mistake and collapses. At last, Prasad & Rambabu affirms it as a play to reform them against the dowry system. Finally, the movie ends on a happy note with the marriage of Rambabu & Rekha.

Cast
Rajendra Prasad as Prasad
Chandra Mohan as Rambabu / Rajesh 
Shantipriya as Rekha
Kalpana as Saroja
Gollapudi Maruthi Rao as Govinda Rao
Suthi Veerabhadra Rao
Suthi Velu
Kota Srinivasa Rao as Peddapuram Siddhaiah
Raavi Kondala Rao as Manager Venkateswara Rao
Kaasi Viswanath as Maddelapalem Madana Gopala Manmadha Rao
KK Sarma
Chidatala Appa Rao as Compounder Appa Rao
Rama Prabha as Chandramma
Anuradha as item number
Y. Vijaya as Meenakshi

Soundtrack

Soundtrack composed by K. Chakravarthy was released through AVM Audio music label. Lyrics were written by C. Narayana Reddy and Sirivennela Seetharama Sastry.

References

External links

Films scored by K. Chakravarthy
Films directed by Relangi Narasimha Rao
Indian comedy films
1980s Telugu-language films